Marcell may refer to:

 Joseph Marcell, an actor from St. Lucia
 Marcell, Minnesota, an unincorporated town
 Marcell Township, Minnesota

See also
 Marcel (disambiguation)
 Marcelle (disambiguation)
 Marcelling, a hair styling technique